Liù Bosisio (born Luigia Bosisio Mauri; 30 January 1936), is an Italian actress and voice actress.

Biography 
Bosisio was born in Milan in the end of January 1936. From 1953 to 1955, She attended the Accademia d'Arte Drammatica in her hometown. Bosisio was a stage actress with the Luca Ronconi company, and was also active as a stand-up comedian. Occasionally active in films in character roles, Bosisio is best known as "Pina", the wife of Paolo Villaggio in several chapters of the Fantozzi film series. Bosisio also appeared in television roles since 1956. Since 1983, Bosisio  focused her work on stage.

Bosisio is also a voice actress, notably being the Italian voice of Spank in Ohayo! Spank and the Italian voice of Marge Simpson for the first 22 seasons of The Simpsons as well as dubbing Patty and Selma.

References

External links 

Italian film actresses
Italian television actresses
Italian stage actresses
1936 births
Actresses from Milan
Living people
Italian voice actresses